The javelin lizard (Delma concinna) is a species of lizard in the Pygopodidae family endemic to Australia.

References

Pygopodids of Australia
Delma
Reptiles described in 1974
Endemic fauna of Australia